Down Home Sessions is the first extended play from American country music artist Cole Swindell. The album peaked at number eight on Top Country Albums and sold 12,000 copies.

Track listing

Charts

References

External links 

2014 debut EPs
Cole Swindell EPs
Warner Records EPs